Pultenaea stricta, commonly known as rigid bush-pea, is a species of flowering plant in the family Fabaceae and is endemic to south-eastern continental Australia. It is a slender, erect or low-lying shrub with elliptic to egg-shaped leaves with the narrower end towards the base, and yellow and red, pea-like flowers.

Description

Taxonomy
Rigid bush-pea was first formally described in 1813 by John Sims in The Botanical Magazine. The specific epithet (stricta) means "erect" or "rigid".

Distribution and habitat
Pultenaea stricta usually grows in wet sites in forest and heathland. It is found south of the Great Dividing Range in southern Victoria, in the far south-east of South Australia and in Tasmania.

References

stricta
Fabales of Australia
Flora of South Australia
Flora of Tasmania
Flora of Victoria (Australia)
Plants described in 1813
Taxa named by John Sims (taxonomist)